Robert F. Evans (1929/1930–1974) was a classical scholar best known for his work One and Holy: The Church in Latin Patristic Thought.

Works

Further reading

References

Historians of Christianity
20th-century births
1974 deaths
Year of birth uncertain